Nationality words link to articles with information on the nation's poetry or literature (for instance, Irish or France).

Events
1341:
 Petrarch becomes Poet Laureate in Rome.

Works published
1340:
Raimon de Cornet and Peire de Ladils compose a partimen

1343:
, an anonymous planh for Robert of Naples

1345:
 Petrarch, De Vita Solitaria, Italy

1346:
 The Vows of the Heron written in Flemish (approximate date)

1348:
Peire Lunel de Montech writes Meravilhar no·s devo pas las gens on the occasion of the Black Death

c. 1340–1349:
Dafydd ap Gwilym writes The Girls of Llanbadarn and The Seagull

Births
Death years link to the corresponding "[year] in poetry" article. There are conflicting or unreliable sources for the birth years of many people born in this period; where sources conflict, the poet is listed again and the conflict is noted:

1343:
 Geoffrey Chaucer (died 1400), English author, poet, philosopher, bureaucrat, courtier and diplomat

1348:
 Jan of Jenštejn (died 1400), Archbishop of Prague who was a poet, writer and composer.

Deaths
Birth years link to the corresponding "[year] in poetry" article:

1342:
 Eifuku-mon In (born 1271), Japanese poet of the Kamakura period and member of the Kyōgoku school of verse
 U Tak (born 1262), Korean poet

1343:
 Ke Jiusi (born 1290), Chinese landscape painter, calligrapher and poet during the Yuan dynasty

1345:
 Manuel Philes (born 1275), Byzantine poet
 Qiao Ji (born unknown), Chinese dramatist and poet during the Yuan dynasty

1346
 Abu Es Haq es Saheli (born 1290), Andalusī-born Arabic poet and architect in the Mali Empire

1347:
 Kokan Shiren (born 1278), Japanese Rinzai Zen patriarch and celebrated poet in Chinese

1348:
 Jacopo Alighieri (born 1289), Italian poet, son of Dante Alighieri
 Sesson Yūbai (born 1290), Japanese Rinzai priest and poet

1349:
 Ibn al-Yayyab (born 1274) Arabic, statesman and poet from the Nasrid kingdom of Granada
 Hamdollah Mostowfi (born 1281), Persian historian, geographer and epic poet

See also

 Poetry
 14th century in poetry
 14th century in literature
 List of years in poetry
 Grands Rhétoriqueurs
 French Renaissance literature
 Renaissance literature
 Spanish Renaissance literature

Other events:
 Other events of the 14th century
 Other events of the 15th century

15th century:
 15th century in poetry
 15th century in literature

Notes

14th-century poetry
Poetry